Sphenodontidae is a family within the reptile group Rhynchocephalia, comprising taxa most closely related to the living tuatara of the genus Sphenodon. Historically the taxa included within Sphenodontidae have varied greatly between analyses, and the group has lacked a formal definition. Cynosphenodon from the Early Jurassic of Mexico has consistently been recovered as a close relative of the tuatara in most analyses, with the clade containing the two often called Sphenodontinae. The herbivorous Eilenodontinae, otherwise considered part of Opisthodontia, is also sometimes considered part of this family as the sister group to Sphenodontinae. Sphenodontines first appeared during the Early Jurassic, and are characterised by a complete lower temporal bar caused by the fusion of the quadrate/quadratojugal and the jugal, which was an adaption for reducing stress in the skull during hard biting. Like modern tuatara, members of Sphenodontinae were likely generalists with a carnivorous/insectivorous diet.

References 

Sphenodontia
Taxa named by Edward Drinker Cope
Reptile families
Extant Early Jurassic first appearances
Toarcian first appearances